Andrew "Andy" Bradfield (1966 – 21 September 2001) was a video game programmer from New Zealand best known for his work on games for the Atari 8-bit family of home computers. He created Laser Hawk (1986) and its sequel Hawkquest (1989). He teamed with artist Harvey Kong Tin on both titles.

He died on 21 September 2001, aged 35, following a two-year battle with leukemia.

References

1966 births
2001 deaths
Video game programmers
Deaths from leukemia
New Zealand computer programmers
New Zealand computer scientists
Deaths from cancer in New Zealand